Kōjiro Station (神代駅, Kōjiro-eki) is a train station located in Kunimi-chō, Unzen, Nagasaki. The station is serviced by Shimabara Railway and is a part of the Shimabara Railway Line.

Lines 
The train station is serving for the Shimabara Railway Line, with the local and express trains stop at the station.

Platforms 
Kōjiro Station consists of two side platform with two tracks.

History 
The station, formerly known as Kōjiromachi Station, was renamed to what it is now on 1 October 2019.

Adjacent stations

See also 
 List of railway stations in Japan

References

External links 
 

Railway stations in Japan opened in 1912
Railway stations in Nagasaki Prefecture
Stations of Shimabara Railway